Thorleifs was a Swedish dansband, formed in 1962 in Norrhult, Kronoberg County, Sweden and led by Thorleif Torstensson. The band sings in Swedish and many other languages, and released some albums in German. It also took part in Melodifestivalen 2009 with the song "Sweet Kissin' in the Moonlight" but did not proceed into the finals.

Members 
 Guitar, lead vocals and saxophone
 Thorleif Torstensson (1962–2012)

 Guitar and vocals
 Magnus Bergdahl (1968–2008)
 Bosse Thyren    (2011–2012)

 Drums and vocals
 Åke Eriksson (1962–1970)
 Jörgen Löfstedt (1970–2012)

 Bass
 Bo Ehrenmo (1962–1969)
 Kim Lindahl (1969–2012)

 Keyboards and accordion
 Johan Möller (1962–1991)
 Bert Månson (1991–1993)
 Johan Bergerfalk (1993–2004)
 Magnus Franzén (2004–2011)
 Magnus Håkansson (2011–2012)

 Keyboards, guitar and saxophone
 Hans Magnusson (1962–2012)

 Trumpet and vocals
 Anders Kjell (1962–1969)

Discography

Studio albums 
 Kommer hem till dig (1973)
 En dag i juni (1974)
 Gråt inga tårar (1975)
 Skänk mig dina tankar (1976)
 Alltid tillsammans (1976)
 72 till 75 (1977)
 Du bara du (1977)
 Kurragömma (1978)
 Sköt om dej (1979)
 12 Golden Hits (1979)
 När dina ögon ler (1980)
 Johnny Blue (1981)
 Aurora (1982)
 Till Folkets park (1987)

 Saxgodingar series
 Saxgodingar instrumentalt (1981) (LP)
 Saxgodingar 2 (1983) (LP)
 Saxgodingar 3 (1987) (CD)
 Historien Thorleifs saxgodingar (1996) (CD)
 Saxgodingar 4 (1998)

 CDs
 Stadens ende speleman (1988)
 Halva mitt hjärta (1989)
 Tillsammans (1991)
 Med dej vill jag leva (1992)
 Och du tände stjärnorna (1994)
 Historien Thorleifs (1995)
 På opfordring (1995)
 En liten ängel (1997)
 En lille engel (1997)
 En liten ängel – Live i Lillehammer (1997)
 Thorleifs jul (1998)
 Thorleifs karaoke (1998)
 På opfordring 2 (1999)
 Ingen är som du (2000)
 Mit dir will ich leben (2002)
 Thorleifs Hit Collection (2002)
 Våra bästa år (2007)
 Förälskade (2008)
 Sweet Kissin' in the Moonlight: Den första kyssen (2009)
 Thorleifs största hits (2010)
 Golden Sax Love Songs (2011)
 Tack & farväl (2012)
 Golden Sax Swing – Vi möts igen (2014)

References

External links 
 Official website
 
 

Dansbands
Musical groups established in 1962
Musical groups disestablished in 2012
1962 establishments in Sweden
2012 disestablishments in Sweden
Melodifestivalen contestants of 2009